WBKE (1490 kHz "Buzz 98.3") is a classic hits formatted broadcast radio station licensed to Fairmont, West Virginia, serving the Fairmont/Grafton area. WBKE is owned and operated by Laurel Highland Total Communications, Inc., through licensee LHTC Media of West Virginia, Inc.

WBKE previously aired Laura Ingraham, The Dana Show, Michael Savage, Mark Levin, Joe Pags, and Red Eye Radio.

On August 6, 2018 WBKE changed their format from news/talk to country, branded as "98.3 Blake FM" (simulcast on FM translator W252EF 98.3 MHz Morgantown).

On June 25, 2019 the station switched to classic hits, as "Buzz 98.3".

Previous logo

References

External links
Official Website

BKE
Classic hits radio stations in the United States